The flag of Indiana was designed by Paul Hadley and officially adopted by the state of Indiana on May 11, 1917. It was the state's first official flag and has remained unchanged since then except for the creation of a statute to standardize the production of the flag.

History

To commemorate the state's 1916 centennial anniversary, the Indiana General Assembly issued a resolution to adopt a state flag. At the request of the General Assembly, a contest was sponsored by the Indiana Society of the Daughters of the American Revolution to design a flag to serve as the official state banner. As an incentive to increase the number of submissions, the contest offered the winner a one hundred dollar cash prize. More than two hundred submissions were received and examined by the Society before a winner was selected. The entry created by Paul Hadley of Mooresville, Indiana, was ultimately chosen as the winner of the contest and the cash prize.

On May 31, 1917, the flag was chosen as the state's official banner. The General Assembly made only one change to Hadley's original design: they added the word Indiana, in a crescent shape, over the top of the torch. The state banner was later renamed the state's flag in a new statute passed in 1955 that also standardized the dimensions of the flag.

The symbols of the Indiana state flag such as the torch in a circle of stars were used in the Indiana Bicentennial Torch Relay in 2016.

Iconography
The flag consists of a gold torch that represents liberty and enlightenment; the rays around the torch represent their far-reaching influence. The nineteen stars represent Indiana's place as the nineteenth state to join the United States. The thirteen stars in the outer loop symbolize the original Thirteen Colonies, the five inner stars represent the next five states added to the Union, and the one large star above the torch represents Indiana.

In 2001, a survey conducted by the North American Vexillological Association (NAVA) placed Indiana's flag 32nd in design quality out of the 72 Canadian provincial, U.S. state and U.S. territorial flags ranked.

Statute

The current statute that governs the design of the state flag states:

The flag's dimensions shall be three feet fly by two feet hoist; or five feet fly by three feet hoist; or any size proportionate to either of those dimensions. The field of the flag shall be blue with nineteen stars and a flaming torch in gold or buff. Thirteen stars shall be arranged in an outer circle, representing the original thirteen states; five stars shall be arranged in a half circle below the torch and inside the outer circle of stars, representing the states admitted prior to Indiana; and the nineteenth star, appreciably larger than the others and representing Indiana shall be placed above the flame of the torch. The outer circle of stars shall be so arranged that one star shall appear directly in the middle at the top of the circle, and the word "Indiana" shall be placed in a half circle over and above the star representing Indiana and midway between it and the star in the center above it. Rays shall be shown radiating from the torch to the three stars on each side of the star in the upper center of the circle.

Usage

Several other laws govern the use of the state flag. The flag is required to be flown by all state militias and the Indiana National Guard. It is to be on display at the Indiana Statehouse at all times. The flag must also be displayed at any agency that is funded in part or in full by the state government, including public schools, state universities, and state parks. In all other respects the flag should be treated with the same care and respect as the flag of the United States.

Most prominently, the team colors for the NBA's Indiana Pacers were taken from the gold and blue of the flag.

In late 2008, Bloomington-licensed CW affiliate WTTV used the flag's torch and stars element in their station logo until 2015 when they became a CBS affiliate, though the logo remains in use for their second digital subchannel.

A variation of the Indiana state flag was used as the Gotham flag in the 1989 movie Batman.  The flag can be seen in the mayor's office.

The logo of the BP-acquired Amoco Corporation (formerly Standard Oil of Indiana) prominently features a torch to commemorate the company's Hoosier origins; it remains in use at the few BP stations using Amoco and Standard trade dress to maintain trademark protection.

See also

List of Indiana state symbols
Great Seal of the State of Indiana

References

External links

Indiana
Symbols of Indiana
 
Indiana
1917 in Indiana